Jenny Herz was an Austrian figure skater who competed in ladies' singles.

She won silver medals in ladies' single skating at the 1906 and the 1907 World Figure Skating Championships.

Competitive highlights

References 

Austrian female single skaters
Date of birth missing
Date of death missing